Ashnoor Kaur (born 3 May 2004) is an Indian actress. She is best known for her acting in several television serials including Jhansi Ki Rani, Yeh Rishta Kya Kehlata Hai and Patiala Babes. In 2018, she made her Bollywood debut with supporting roles in Sanju and Manmarziyaan.

Personal life 
In 2019, Kaur scored 93% in her class X CBSE boards. In 2021, she scored 94% in her class XII HSC boards.

Career 
Kaur started her career at the age of five, playing the character of Prachi in the 2009 series Jhansi Ki Rani. In 2010, she played Panna in Saath Nibhaana Saathiya of StarPlus. She later played Navika Vyas Bhatnagar in the television series Na Bole Tum Na Maine Kuch Kaha and  Na Bole Tum Na Maine Kuch Kaha 2.

She acted as young Mayra Kapoor in the show Bade Achhe Lagte Hain. She appeared in CID, and as Ashok Sundari in the mythological series, Devon Ke Dev...Mahadev. She had played the role of young Naira Singhania in Yeh Rishta Kya Kehlata Hai. Kaur played Dushala in the 2013 television series Mahabharat, and was also seen in Prithvi Vallabh as Princess Vilas.

Kaur was part of Anurag Kashyap's film Manmarziyaan in the role of Taapsee Pannu 's sister.

From 2018 to 2020, Kaur played Mini Babita/Khurana in the Sony TV show Patiala Babes.

Filmography

Television

Special appearances

Films

Web series

Music videos

Awards and nominations

References

External links

Living people
21st-century Indian child actresses
2004 births
Indian soap opera actresses